Carex basiantha is a tussock-forming species of perennial sedge in the family Cyperaceae. It is native to temperate parts of the south-central and south-eastern United States.

See also
List of Carex species

References

basiantha
Plants described in 1855
Taxa named by Ernst Gottlieb von Steudel
Flora of Alabama
Flora of Arkansas
Flora of Florida
Flora of Georgia (U.S. state)
Flora of Louisiana
Flora of Mississippi
Flora of New Mexico
Flora of North Carolina
Flora of South Carolina
Flora of Oklahoma
Flora of Texas
Flora of Tennessee